Mearnsetin is an O-methylated flavonol. It can be found in Eucalyptus globulus and in Elaeocarpus lanceofolius. The compound has antioxidative properties.

Mearnsetin 3,7-dirhamnoside can be found in the fern Asplenium antiquum.

References 

O-methylated flavonols
Resorcinols